Eduardo "Veio" de Lima is a 6th degree black belt in Brazilian Jiu-Jitsu (BJJ) under Carlos "Carlinhos" Gracie, Jr. and the head of Gracie Barra Clearwater. He has won several gold medals in the black belt divisions at the Pan American Championships.

Eduardo began training in BJJ at age nineteen after his friend Renzo Gracie recommended he try a class at the Gracie Barra Academy in Rio de Janeiro, Brazil. For the first two years, he studied under Jean Jacques Machado, then the head instructor, who awarded his blue and purple belts before leaving for America. From then on Carlos Gracie, Jr. was his instructor and awarded his brown and then black belt (the latter in 1997 after 8 years of training).

As a purple belt, Eduardo was made an instructor for white belts and less experienced blue belts, but by the time he was promoted to brown belt, everyone was attending his class, including black belts. Once he reached the rank of black belt, Eduardo was made the head instructor of Gracie Barra. Roger Gracie, one of the most successful BJJ competitors today, was one of his pupils in the children's class during his tenure as instructor.

In 2000, with the help of Carlos Gracie, Jr. and American businessman Bob Rosseti, Eduardo came to the United States. He taught BJJ out of a Taekwondo dojang in Dunedin, Florida until he was able to start his own school in Clearwater. While in America, he has trained award-winning white, blue, purple, brown and black belt competitors. He is also a member of the Florida Federation of Brazilian Jiu-Jitsu.

See also 

 Gracie Barra

References 

 Gracie Barra Clearwater. . graciebarraclearwater.com. URL last accessed on July 20, 2006.
 Gracie Barra. Carlos Gracie Jr Team - Gracie Barra Black Belts. graciebarra.com.br. URL last accessed on July 12, 2006.
 BJJ.org. Eduardo de Lima. bjj.org. URL last accessed on July 12, 2006.
 International Brazilian Jiu-Jitsu Federation. Results, Brazilian Championship 1996,  Pan American Championship 1997, 1998, 1999, 2001, 2002, 2003, 2004, 2005. cbjj.com.br. URL last accessed on July 12, 2006.
 Florida Federation of Brazilian Jiu-Jitsu. Academies. floridajiujitsufed.com. URL last accessed on July 13, 2006.

External links 
 Gracie Barra Clearwater

Brazilian practitioners of Brazilian jiu-jitsu
People awarded a black belt in Brazilian jiu-jitsu
Living people
Year of birth missing (living people)